Kyle John Solomon Alexander (born October 21, 1996) is a Canadian professional basketball player for Valencia of the Spanish Liga ACB and the EuroLeague. He played college basketball for the Tennessee Volunteers.

High school career
Alexander was born in Scarborough, Ontario and grew up in Milton, Ontario and attended Orangeville Prep in Orangeville, Ontario, where he would originally play soccer and volleyball before picking up basketball in his junior year. Alexander would become roommates with Denver Nuggets guard Jamal Murray. Additionally, Alexander played AAU basketball with the CIA Bounce, again teaming up with Murray.

College career
Alexander played college basketball for the Tennessee Volunteers for 4 years. As a senior, he averaged 7.3 points, 6.6 rebounds, 1.7 blocks and 23.8 minutes per game. Alexander helped lead the team to the Sweet Sixteen, shooting 61.4 percent from the field and 42.9 percent from three-point range.

Professional career

Sioux Falls Skyforce (2019–2020) 
After going undrafted in the 2019 NBA draft, Alexander joined the Miami Heat for the 2019 NBA Summer League. On July 15, 2019, Alexander was signed by the Heat to a training camp contract. Following training camp, Alexander was added to the roster of the Heat's NBA G League affiliate, the Sioux Falls Skyforce.

Miami Heat (2020) 
On January 15, 2020, Alexander signed a two-way contract with the Miami Heat. The following day, it was announced that Alexander was sidelined with a knee injury. He made his NBA debut on August 6, 2020, where he played one minute off the bench and recorded one rebound in a 130-116 loss to the Milwaukee Bucks. The Heat reached the 2020 NBA Finals, but lost in 6 games to the Los Angeles Lakers.

Fuenlabrada (2020–2022) 
On December 2, 2020, Alexander signed with Fuenlabrada of the Spanish Liga ACB. He averaged 9 points and 6.2 rebounds per game. On August 23, 2021, Alexander re-signed with the team.

Scarborough Shooting Stars (2022) 
On May 16, 2022, Alexander signed with the Scarborough Shooting Stars of the CEBL.

Valencia (2022–present) 
On July 22, 2022, Alexander signed with Valencia of the Spanish Liga ACB.

Career statistics

NBA

Regular season

|-
| style="text-align:left;"| 
| style="text-align:left;"| Miami
| 2 || 0 || 6.7 || .500 || – || – || 1.5 || .0 || .0 || .0 || 1.0
|- class="sortbottom"
| style="text-align:center;" colspan="2"| Career
| 2 || 0 || 6.7 || .500 || – || – || 1.5 || .0 || .0 || .0 || 1.0

College

|-
| style="text-align:left;"| 2015–16
| style="text-align:left;"| Tennessee
| 32 || 11 || 12.2 || .432 || – || .656 || 3.2 || .1 || .2 || 1.0 || 1.7
|-
| style="text-align:left;"| 2016–17
| style="text-align:left;"| Tennessee
| 32 || 23 || 14.0 || .466 || .167 || .500 || 4.0 || .2 || .2 || 1.0 || 3.3
|-
| style="text-align:left;"| 2017–18
| style="text-align:left;"| Tennessee
| 34 || 34 || 20.3 || .681 || 1.000 || .712 || 5.6 || .3 || .6 || 1.7 || 5.6
|-
| style="text-align:left;"| 2018–19
| style="text-align:left;"| Tennessee
| 37 || 37 || 23.8 || .619 || .429 || .658 || 6.7 || .5 || .5 || 1.7 || 7.4
|- class="sortbottom"
| style="text-align:center;" colspan="2"| Career
| 135 || 105 || 17.8 || .587 || .357 || .638 || 4.9 || .3 || .3 || 1.4 || 4.6

Personal life
Alexander is the son of Joseph and Audrey Alexander. His father Joseph played college basketball for the Niagara Purple Eagles from 1982 to 1986. He has two sisters, named Kayla and Kesia. His sister Kayla is also a professional basketball player and was a member of the Canada women's national basketball team for Team Canada at the 2020 Olympics in Tokyo, and formerly of the Minnesota Lynx of the WNBA.

References

External links

Tennessee Volunteers bio

1996 births
Living people
Baloncesto Fuenlabrada players
Basketball players from Toronto
Black Canadian basketball players
Canadian expatriate basketball people in Spain
Canadian expatriate basketball people in the United States
Canadian men's basketball players
Amateur Athletic Union men's basketball players
Liga ACB players
Miami Heat players
National Basketball Association players from Canada
Power forwards (basketball)
Scarborough Shooting Stars players
Sioux Falls Skyforce players
Sportspeople from Milton, Ontario
Sportspeople from Scarborough, Toronto
Tennessee Volunteers basketball players
Undrafted National Basketball Association players